RADCOM  is a provider of quality monitoring and service assurance software for telecommunications carriers, founded in 1991. RADCOM's U.S. headquarters is in Paramus, New Jersey and its international headquarters is in Tel Aviv, Israel. RADCOM is a member of the RAD Group of companies. The company is traded on the Nasdaq exchange.

Products
RADCOM provides service assurance and customer experience management for telecom operators and communications service providers. 
RADCOM provides software for telecommunications carriers to carry out customer experience monitoring and to manage their networks and services.
RADCOM offers software for network function virtualization (NFV). 
In August 2020, RADCOM announced support for 5G networks.

History 
RADCOM started as an internal project within the RAD Group in 1985 and incorporated in 1991. The company received initial funding from Star Venture, Evergreen and  Pitango Venture Capital funds.

In September 1997, the company had an initial public offering on Nasdaq. Net proceeds to the company were approximately $20.2 million.

References

External links

 Yahoo! Finance Radcom Ltd.(RDCM)

Telecommunications equipment vendors
Networking hardware companies
Electronics companies of Israel
Electronics companies established in 1991
Israeli brands
Israeli companies established in 1991
Companies based in Tel Aviv
Companies listed on the Nasdaq